Fernando Lyra (8 October 1938 – 14 February 2013) was a Brazilian politician who served as Minister of Justice from 1985 to 1986. Born in Recife in 1938, Lyra died in São Paulo on 14 February 2013, at the age of 74.

References 

1938 births
2013 deaths
Ministers of Justice of Brazil
Government ministers of Brazil
Brazilian Democratic Movement politicians
Democratic Labour Party (Brazil) politicians
Politicians from Recife

Candidates for Vice President of Brazil